D. James Umpleby III is an American businessman. He became the CEO of Caterpillar Inc. as of January 2017, and chairman of the Caterpillar board of directors in December 2018.

Biography

Early life and education
Umpleby was raised in Highland, Indiana and attended Rose-Hulman Institute of Technology. He graduated with a Bachelor of Science in Mechanical Engineering in 1980.

Career
After graduating from Rose-Hulman, Umpleby joined Solar Turbines, Inc. in San Diego, California shortly thereafter.  Solar Turbines, a wholly owned Caterpillar subsidiary, is one of the world's leading manufacturers of industrial gas turbine systems. Over the course of his career at Caterpillar, Umpleby has held leadership positions in a variety of functions across the world. Umpleby became a Caterpillar vice president and president of Solar Turbines in 2010. Immediately prior to becoming CEO in 2017, Umpleby was group president of Caterpillar’s energy and transportation business segment. On December 12, 2018 the Caterpillar board of directors elected Umpleby to be chairman of the board, effective immediately, in addition to his CEO role.

In September 2017, Caterpillar held a conference for investors at which Umpleby presented the details of a new corporate strategy focused on profitable growth, through expanded product offerings, increased focus on operational excellence and providing services in digitally-enabled technologies and other areas that support customers. 
Barron’s, a U.S.-based financial magazine, described the new corporate strategy stating, “…investors can expect a more return-focused company . . . with a new approach similar to what we have seen from its peers, such as Deere (DE), Parker Hannifin (PH), Cummins (CMI) and Illinois Tool Works (ITW) that are further along this journey. If executed, we believe that this should drive improved financial returns, which are currently in the middle of the pack, and a possible re-rating of the stock over time.” 

Umpleby was elected to the board of directors of the Chevron Corporation effective March 1, 2018.

References

Year of birth missing (living people)
Place of birth missing (living people)
Living people
American chief executives of manufacturing companies
Businesspeople from Illinois
Caterpillar Inc. people
Peterson Institute for International Economics